Mark Fleischmann (born 31 January 1972) is an English actor.

Background
Mark Fleischmann was born in 1972 and grew up in Hampstead Garden Suburb. After graduating from the Central School of Speech and Drama in London, Fleischmann appeared in several films, television series and theater plays. His acting career began in Edinburgh, where he played a hyena in the Lion King musical. After it he organised and ran comedy club nights in British pubs. In 2008, Fleischmann played a main role in The Collector, which was shown at the Arcola Theatre in London. In 2010, he played the recurring character Lloyd Pinky in the TV series Being Human and fronted the Being Human website. In 2011, he produced his own show which could be seen at The Enterprise in London. In 2013, he played a main role in the theater play Marriage at the Belgrade Theatre. From 2012–2017, he portrayed the recurring character Mr. Jeffries in the British television series Wolfblood.

Filmography

Film

Television

Web series

Music videos

References

External links

1972 births
English male television actors
Living people
English male film actors
21st-century English male actors
People from Hampstead
Male actors from London
Alumni of the Royal Central School of Speech and Drama